The following lists events that happened during 1904 in China.

Incumbents 
Guangxu Emperor  (25th year)

Events

January
 January 13 — Chang Chih-tung and other advisers propose ending the civil service examinations.

February 
 February 25 - Huang Xing and Song Jiaoren establish the revolutionary Society for the Revival of the Chinese Nation  in Changsha.

March 
 March — The Shanghai radical paper The Alarm Bell is shut down under German pressure 
 March 31 - The British Indian Army and the Qing dynasty garrison troops in charge of Qumei Xingu exchanged fire. The British Indian Army slaughtered more than 700 people with machine guns and artillery.

April 
 In mid-April - the British Indian Army entered the Gyantse County. In the face of the strong fortifications of Gyangzong Zongshan, the British army transferred more than 4,000 reinforcements and eight cannons from India and a large number of advanced armor-piercing projectiles.

June
 June 12 - the “Eastern Times“ was published in Shanghai, and was published by Japanese Munakata Kotarou . The actual founder was Di Chuqing . At the beginning of the publication, Kang Youwei's student Luo Xiaogao served as the chief editor, and the newspaper became an important mouthpiece of Kang Youwei and Liang Qichao.
 June 21 — A special Imperial pardon is extended to all reformers of 1898, except Sun Yat-sen, Liang Qichao, and Kang Youwei
 Kwangsi revolt of a Heaven and Earth Society (underway since 1902) 
 June 24 — The Kwangsi rebels take Liucheng

July 
 July 7 - the British Indian Army captured Gyantse County Zongshan.
 July 31 — The Imperial Court orders the governors of south China to suppress the Kwangsi revolt after the rebels take Ishan

August 
 August 3 - Lhasa was occupied by the British Indian Army, and the 13th Dalai Lama fled to Mongolia via Qinghai.
 August 24 — Imperial troops defeat the rebels at Ishan

September 
 Sep.23-Oct.05 — The Kwangsi rebels briefly take Loshing

October 
 Octobar 17 - Zhang Boling founded Tianjin Nankai High School.

Nov /  Dec 
 November — The leader of the Kwangsi revolt is captured by Imperial forces
 Nov /  Dec — The secret ‘Restoration Society’ is established in Shanghai by revolutionary intellectuals (see 1910) 
 1904 — Sun Yat-sen publishes his manifesto Summary of the Revolution.

Births 
 August 22 — Deng Xiaoping, in Sichuan Paramount Leader of China (died 1997)

Deaths 
 April 13 - Imperial Noble Consort Shushen, a consort of the Tongzhi Emperor of the Qing dynasty (b. 1859).
 Qiu Yufang, revolutionary, writer and feminist (b. 1871)

References